Borysenko or Borisenko is a Ukrainian-language surname derived from the first name Boris. It may refer to:
Andrei Borisenko 
Georgy Borisenko
Pavlo Borysenko
Milana Borisenko
Sergey Borisenko 
Valentina Borisenko 
Vladimir Borisenko 
Vyacheslav Borysenko

See also
 
 

Ukrainian-language surnames
Surnames of Ukrainian origin
Patronymic surnames
Surnames from given names